= Golovkin's dacha =

Building in Samara, Russia

Coordinates: 53°14′50.32″N 50°10′23.85″E

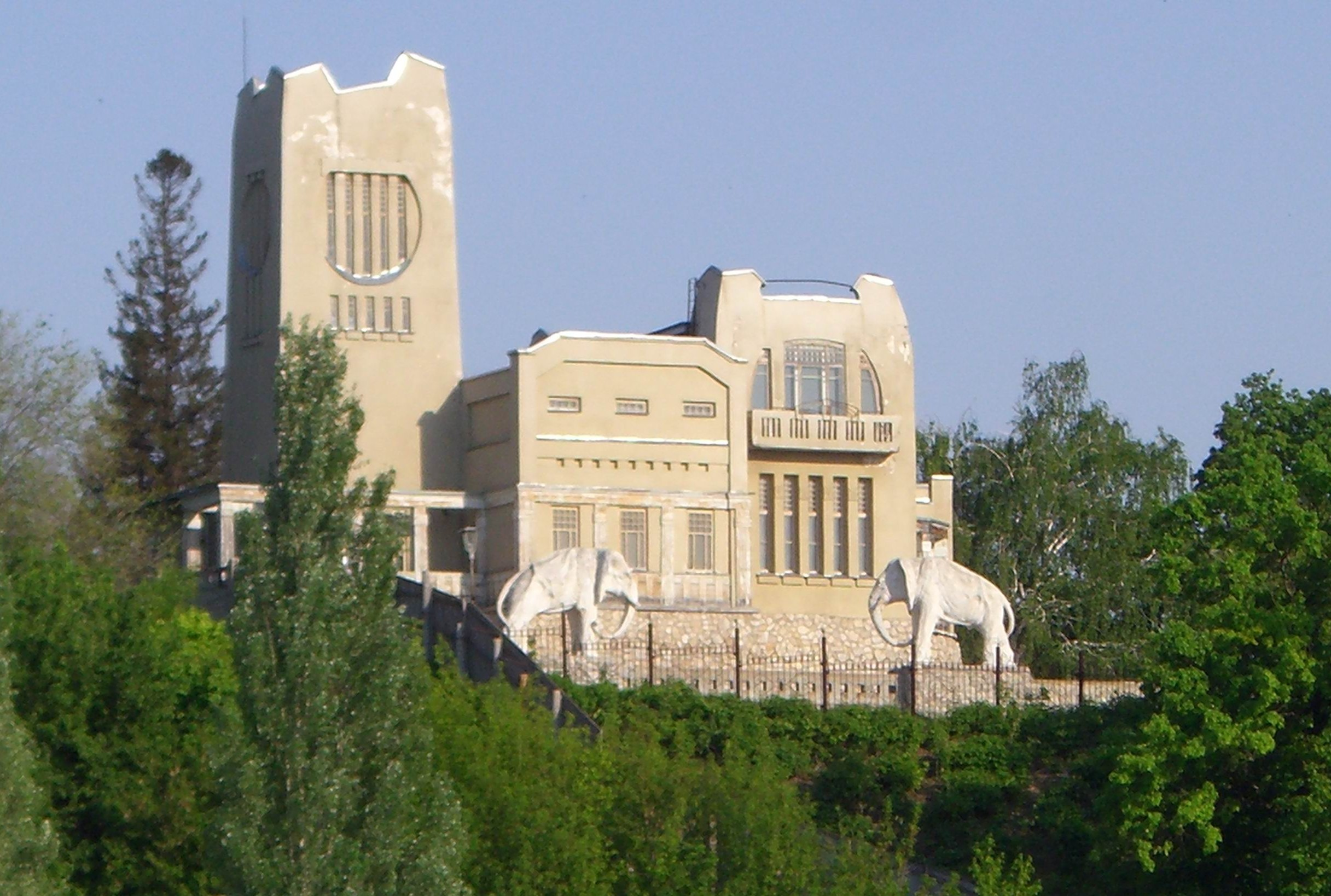

Golovkin's dacha (Russian: Дача Головкина, also known as the Elephant House, Russian: Дом со слонами) is an unorthodox residential mansion ("dacha") designed and constructed by Konstantin Golovkin, a merchant, entrepreneur and self-taught artist, in Samara, Russia during the period 1908–1909. The building is marked by modernist influences, linked to the Vienna Secession style, and even premonitions of Art Deco. It is inscribed in the Russian Cultural Heritage list as object number 6310041002.
